Lake Tikitapu, more commonly known as Blue Lake, is the smallest of four small lakes lying between Lake Rotorua and Lake Tarawera in the Bay of Plenty Region of New Zealand's North Island. The other three are Lake Rotokakahi (Green Lake), Lake Okareka, and Lake Okataina.

Lake Tikitapu gets its name, Blue Lake, for its aqua colour. Its stunning blue colour can be attributed to the pumice and rhyolite that lies on the lake bed.

Lake Tikitapu was formed 13,300 years ago as the result of a lava dam. The lake has a flat bed and, as a collapsed volcanic crater, it only has a maximum depth of 27.5m. The lake is approximately 150 hectares in size, with a catchment size of 620 hectares.

Activities and Leisure 
There are plenty of activities to do on and surrounding the lake. On the lake, swimming, boating, trout fishing and watersports are popular activities. Both rainbow trout and brook trout reside in the lake, making it very popular with experienced and recreational fishers.

Popular with both locals and visitors; walking and biking tracks surround the lake. The 5.5km Blue Lake walking track circles the lake and weaves through native bush and exotic conifers of the Whakarewarewa Forest. The track comes to an end, reaching the beaches at the end of the lake. The track has been graded as easy, with the average walker taking an hour and thirty minutes to complete the track. The Tangaroamihi biking trail connects Lake Tikitapu to the Whakarewarewa Forest mountain bike trail network. It is a grade 2, 2.5km trail.

The available facilities at Lake Tikitapu include BBQ's and picnic tables, children's playgrounds, ski lanes and boat ramps and public toilets, making it a popular choice for families.

Lake Tikitapu hosts numerous events throughout the year; these events range from rowing regattas, wakeboarding competitions, Waka Ama events and many more.

History 
Lake Tikitapu is immersed in Māori history. The name itself is stemmed from a sacred greenstone, or pounamu, necklace that is believed to have been worn by a daughter of a high ranking chief. It is understood that the daughter lost the necklace as she bathed in the crystal waters.

New Zealand flatwater canoeist, Lisa Carrington, has competed in events numerous times at Blue Lake regattas. In 2018, she won all six of her events, and in 2020 Carrington won both the K1 (single kayak) 200m and K1 500m finals.

Legend of Lake Tikitapu 
Māori legend also surrounds the lake. Legend says that the Taniwha monster, named Kataore, lived in Lake Tikitapu. Kataore's initial loveable nature had changed as he grew up, and he became a mischievous taniwha who preyed on lone travellers. He was known to devour unsuspecting travelers in one gulp. 

Kataore's actions were getting out of hand, and he soon felt the rage of the neighbouring tribes. Kataore later made a detrimental mistake; he swallowed the chief's daughter, as she was on her way to be wed to a young chief, Reretoi. After hearing of this disaster, Reretoi assembled 140 bold warriors to seek revenge. Reretoi and his men managed to draw Kataore out of his cave and noose his neck, attack and slay him with tewhatewha and kotiate. Kataore's body was stripped of his flesh, and his heart was eaten by the tohunga between the Blue and Green Lakes.

References 

Lakes of the Bay of Plenty Region
Okataina Volcanic Centre
Volcanic crater lakes